Archduke Rainer of Austria (30 September 1783 – 16 January 1853) was a Viceroy of the Kingdom of Lombardy-Venetia from 1818 to 1848. He was also an Archduke of Austria, Prince Royal of Hungary and Bohemia.

Biography
Rainer was a son of Emperor Leopold II and Empress Maria Luisa, and was thus a younger brother of Francis II, Holy Roman Emperor.

Although Rainer suffered from a mild form of epilepsy, this did not visibly interfere with his military career.

Rainer served as Viceroy of the Kingdom of Lombardy–Venetia from 1818 to 1848. The position made Rainer and his wife the head of the Austrian court at Milan. Rainer's politics were increasingly unpopular, the Italians resented him for their lack of political freedom and for collecting revenues with so little benefit to them. 

Throughout the 1840s, the political situation worsened to such an extent that in 1847, Metternich resurrected his 1817 plans for an Italian chancellery by sending his right-hand man count Charles-Louis de Ficquelmont to Milan as acting Chancellor of Lombardy–Venetia to restore the Austrian rule while taking over Northern Italy's administration. But only a few months later, Ficquelmont was recalled to Vienna to assume the leadership of the Council of war as the Revolutions of 1848 started.

Archduke Rainer's mistakes as well as the lack of understanding between Rainer and Feldmarschall Graf Radetzky, were blamed for the disasters of the Italian Revolution of 1848.

Marriage and children

He married at Prague on 28 May 1820 Princess Elisabeth of Savoy (13 April 1800 – 25 December 1856). She was the sister of the Prince of Carignano, who would in 1831 become King of Sardinia as King Charles Albert. She was also a granddaughter of the late former Duke of the Baltic principality of Courland.

Children included: 

 Maria (6 February 1821 – 23 Jan 1844) – unmarried, no issue
 Adelaide (3 June 1822 – 20 January 1855) – wife of Victor Emmanuel II, from 1849 king of Sardinia
 Leopold  (6 June 1823 – 24 May 1898) – Oberkommandant der Marine ('High Commander of the Navy') from 1864 to 1868
 Ernst (8 August 1824 – 4 April 1899), Feldmarschalleutnant
 Sigismund (7 January 1826 – 15 December 1891), Feldmarschalleutnant
 Rainer (11 January 1827 – 27 January 1913) – Austrian Minister President 1859–61; his visit to the Hotel Greif in Wels is commemorated by a wall plaque there.  Married Archduchess Maria Karoline of Austria (1825-1915).  No issue.
 Heinrich (9 May 1828 – 30 November 1891), Feldmarschalleutnant
 Maximilian (16 January 1830 – 16 March 1839)

The Revolution of 1848 forced Rainer and Elisabeth from the court at Milan; when the insurrection was quelled, Radetzky was named Rainer's successor as Viceroy. Although his children, except Adelheid, are buried in the Imperial Crypt in Vienna, he and his wife are buried at the Maria Himmelfahrtskirche in Bolzano.

Through his daughter Adelaide, Rainer is an ancestor of the entire royal family of Italy which reigned from 1861 to 1946.

Ancestry

Notes

1783 births
1853 deaths
19th-century viceregal rulers
House of Habsburg-Lorraine
Austrian princes
People from Pisa
Knights of the Golden Fleece of Austria
Grand Crosses of the Order of Saint Stephen of Hungary
Sons of emperors
Children of Leopold II, Holy Roman Emperor
People with epilepsy
Royalty and nobility with disabilities
Sons of kings
People from the Austrian Empire